is a Japanese figure skater. She is the 2022 Grand Prix de France bronze medalist, the 2022 NHK Trophy bronze medalist, and 2022 Coupe du Printemps silver medalist. Earlier in her career, she won bronze at the 2018 JGP Canada and silver at the 2021–22 Japanese Junior Championships.

Personal life 
Sumiyoshi was born on 15 August 2003 in Tokyo, Japan. She enjoys cooking.

Career

Early years 
Sumiyoshi began skating in 2007. She won the 2016–17 Japan Novice A Championships and then placed thirteenth at the 2016–17 Japan Junior Championships. She was invited to skate in the gala at the 2016 NHK Trophy as the reigning Japanese national novice champion. Sumiyoshi won a bronze medal at 2017 Bavarian Open in the advanced novice level, Group I.

2018–19 season 
Sumiyoshi made her junior debut at the 2018 Asian Open and finished in sixth place. She was assigned to make her Junior Grand Prix debut at the 2018 JGP Canada in Richmond. Sumiyoshi fell twice in the short program, once on footwork and once on her jump combination, ranking seventh in that segment. She had a clean free skate despite an under-rotation on a jump combination and won the bronze medal behind Russia's Anastasia Tarakanova and Anna Shcherbakova. She was fourth at 2018 JGP Slovenia in Ljubljana and was the third alternate for 2018–19 Junior Grand Prix Final. 

Sumiyoshi finished ninth at 2018–19 Japan Junior Championships, concluding her season.

2019–20 season 
In her lone Junior Grand Prix appearance for the year, Sumiyoshi finished eighth at the 2019 JGP Latvia. She did not compete for the remainder of the season.

2020–21 season 
With the COVID-19 pandemic greatly limiting junior competition internationally, Sumiyoshi competed at the 2020–21 Japan Junior Championships and placed fifth. She was invited to 2020–21 Japan Championships and finished in twelfth place.

2021–22 season 
In light of the pandemic, the Japan Skating Federation opted not to send junior skaters out internationally in the fall of 2021. As a result, Sumiyoshi did not have the opportunity to compete on the Junior Grand Prix. At 2021–22 Japan Junior Championships, Sumiyoshi was first after the short program but won the silver medal overall after a third-place free skate. At 2021–22 Japan Championships, she finished in eighth place.

Sumiyoshi was sent to 2022 Coupe du Printemps, her first international competition as a senior skater, winning the silver medal behind fellow Japanese skater Rinka Watanabe. 

In light of her junior national silver medal and senior nationals placement, Sumiyoshi had been assigned to finish her season at the 2022 World Junior Championships. These were soon disrupted by the Russian invasion of Ukraine. In response to the invasion, the International Skating Union banned all Russian and Belarusian athletes from competing at ISU championships. With the Russian women having dominated the women's discipline in recent years, their absence significantly altered the field at Junior Worlds. However, due to both the invasion and concerns related to the Omicron variant, the World Junior Championships could not be held as scheduled in Sofia in early March, and were later moved to mid-April in Tallinn, Estonia. Competing in Tallinn, Sumiyoshi qualified to the free skate in ninth position. She rose to eighth place in the free skate.

2022–23 season 
During the 2022–23 figure skating season, Sumiyoshi made her senior debut on the ISU Grand Prix series. At the 2022 Grand Prix de France, she won the bronze medal behind Loena Hendrickx and Kim Ye-lim. She attempted a quad toe loop in the free skate but was unsuccessful. She revealed afterward that "I started practicing the quad toe last summer, and at that point, my success rate was not very good. This year, I was really able to elevate my success rate is about half in terms of landing or stepping out." She gained a second Grand Prix assignment, the 2022 NHK Trophy, as one of her federation's host picks. Competing in Sapporo, Sumiyoshi was third in the short program with a new personal best of 68.01 despite a quarter underrotating call on her jump combination. She fell twice in the free skate, including on her downgraded quad attempt, placing fourth in that segment but remaining third overall by a margin of 4.12 points over American Audrey Shin. She reflected, "considering that this is my first senior Grand Prix and I got third place in both competitions, I am happy. However, regarding my performance today, there were so many regrettable points." Sumiyoshi said she was focused on preparing for the national championships.

Sumiyoshi finished fourteenth at the 2022–23 Japan Championships. Named to the Japanese team for the 2023 Winter World University Games, she came fourth at the event, nine points back of bronze medalist Kim.

Programs

Competitive highlights 
GP: Grand Prix; CS: Challenger Series; JGP: Junior Grand Prix

2018–19 season to present

Earlier career

Detailed results 
Current personal best scores are highlighted in bold.

Senior level

Junior level

Novice level

References

External links 
 
 SUMIYOSHI Rion at the Japan Skating Federation
 

Japanese female single skaters
Living people
2003 births
Sportspeople from Tokyo
21st-century Japanese women
Competitors at the 2023 Winter World University Games